Saint-Pierre is a village municipality in Joliette Regional County Municipality in the Lanaudière region of Quebec, Canada.

Demographics 

Population:
 Population in 2016: 276 (2011 to 2016 population change: -9.5%)
 Population in 2011: 305 (2006 to 2011 population change: 0.3%)
 Population in 2006: 304
 Population in 2001: 293
 Population in 1996: 357
 Population in 1991: 358

Mother tongue:
 English as first language: 0%
 French as first language: 100%
 English and French as first language: 0%
 Other as first language: 0%

Education

The Sir Wilfrid Laurier School Board operates anglophone public schools, including:
 Joliette Elementary School in Saint-Charles-Borromée
 Joliette High School in Joliette

See also
List of village municipalities in Quebec

References

Incorporated places in Lanaudière
Villages in Quebec